The 2013 Grand Prix Cycliste de Montréal is the fourth edition of the Grand Prix Cycliste de Montréal, a single-day professional bicycle road race. It was the 26th event of the 2013 UCI World Tour season. The race is one of only two events which are part of the World Tour calendar in North America, the other one being the 2013 Grand Prix Cycliste de Québec contested two days prior.

Teams
The race is held under the auspices of the UCI World Tour, and all nineteen UCI ProTeams are invited automatically. There is also one wildcard invitation, taken by. A Canadian national squad also competed in the race, and as such, formed the event's 21-team peloton.
The 21 teams that competed in the race were:

Canada (national team) †

 †

Course
The race consisted of 17 laps of a circuit  in length, and followed the same path as the 2011 edition. The circuit, around the main campus of the Université de Montréal, was well-suited for climbers and punchers with three climbs per lap. The finish was on an uphill climb with a small gradient of 4%, that was located on Avenue du Parc. There was a sharp, 180 degrees bend to the right situated 500 meters away from the line.  The total vertical climb of the race was 3,893 metres. The major difficulties were:

Kilometre 2: Côte Camilien-Houde: 1,8 kilometres, average gradient of 8%
Kilometre 6: Côte de la Polytechnque: 780 metres, average gradient of 6% with a pass of 200 metres at 11%
Kilometre 11: Avenue du Parc: 560 metres, average gradient of 4%

Results

References

External links
 
 Photos of the race

2013
2013 UCI World Tour
Grand Prix Cycliste de Montreal
Grand Prix Cycliste de Montréal
Grand Prix Cycliste de Montréal